Travelex is a foreign exchange company founded by Lloyd Dorfman and headquartered in Peterborough. Its main businesses are foreign currency exchange, issuing prepaid credit cards for use by travellers, supplying central banks with foreign currency and global remittance. Travelex operates more than 1,100 stores and 900 ATMs in over 20 countries.

History
Travelex was founded as Express Exchange by Dorfman and opened its first branch in central London in 1976. By 1978 the company had four central London stores.

The company experienced growth in the 1980s, opening its first international store in 1984 in Rotterdam, and its first store at Heathrow Terminal 4 in 1986. Express Exchange subsequently became Travellers Exchange Corporation — or Travelex — when abbreviated.

Travelex expanded throughout the US and into the APAC region in the 1990s. The company also undertook a series of investments, acquisitions and takeovers during this period, including a takeover of Abbey National's retail forex operation, receiving investment from 3i and the acquisition of Transpay.

On 8 November 2000, it bought Thomas Cook's worldwide foreign exchange business for £440m, which significantly expanded its international operations. Travelex also launched their first stores in the Indian, Chinese and Middle Eastern markets, undertook further acquisitions and launched a new brand identity during the 2000s.

In February 2005, buy-out firm Apax Partners bought a majority stake in the company, but Dorfman retained 30% and continued to run the business.

In 2011 Travelex sold its prepaid card programme management business to MasterCard and its international payments business to Western Union for a combined £900m. In 2011 Travelex also purchased Grupo Confidence, Brazil's largest independent foreign exchange business.

By March 2014, Travelex had more than 1,500 stores and 1,250 ATMs in 27 countries.

In 2014, Apax Partners sold its majority stake of 51% to UAE-based Indian businessman B. R. Shetty valuing the company at approx £1bn. Shetty also owned UAE Exchange, a UAE-based money transfer business. The acquisition was supported by Abu Dhabi-based investment vehicle Centurion and completed in January 2015.

In May 2019, Travelex, UAE Exchange and a number of other financial service businesses operated by B. R. Shetty were placed into a holding company called Finablr, prior to an IPO on the London Stock Exchange that took place on 15 May that year.

In October 2019 Travelex announced the launch of a US-based international payments system in partnership with Finablr and Samsung Pay.

In 2020 the company faced difficulties including a cyber incident, the impact of the Covid-19 pandemic and issues relating to Travelex's parent company, Finablr. Later that year Travelex fell into administration, before it was taken over by its debt holders. As a result of the takeover, the business was restructured and became "New Travelex."

2019 cyber incident 
On 31 December 2019, Travelex took its UK and international websites and mobile apps offline following a reported cyber incident an action that also affected a number of large corporate third parties to whom Travelex provided a white-labelled travel money service including the online travel money services of supermarket chains such as ASDA, Tesco and Sainsbury's.

On 7 January 2020, it was claimed that the company was being held to ransom by hackers. The cyber criminals reportedly demanded £4.6 million ($6 million) in ransom from Travelex after infecting its network with Sodinokibi ransomware, having claimed to have copied more than 5GB of customer personal data.

The hackers demanded payment in exchange for either restoration of IT systems or the preservation of customer data, and it was understood that a deadline of seven days payment was set by the cyber criminals.

On 13 January 2020, the company issued a formal statement on the resumption of services and promised that a "recovery road map" would be issued later in the week. It stated that the business had continued to trade throughout January, with in-store services and ATMs available and stated that there had been no evidence of loss of customer data.

On 16 January 2020, the company announced that it had managed to restore the automated order placement used by several UK high street banks and that it would relaunch its international money transfer service by the end of the month. On 17 January 2020, boss Tony D'Souza said, in a video message on a back-up website, that the IT system used by in-store staff was working again.

2020 administration, restructuring and new ownership 
On 26 May 2020, Travelex announced a wave of redundancies citing the COVID-19 pandemic. In the months prior, Travelex had also faced the cyber incident of 31 Dec 2019 and serious fraud allegations at its then-parent, Finablr. At the time, CEO Tony D'Souza said:"While we remain unsure about what the future holds for Travelex, we know that we need to do everything we can in order to give the business the best chance of long-term viability. Sadly, this means that we anticipate that there will be a reduction in the number of roles and therefore employees, from several teams across our global business"On 15 June 2020, Travelex announced that it had terminated its attempt to sell itself, the action having been originally announced by the business on 13 May 2020.

On 30 June 2020, on the day they had been due, Travelex announced that it would be delaying the publication of its FY 2019 accounts. The business stated that its delayed completion of financial statements was owing to the cyber incident and implications of COVID-19.

On 1 July 2020, Travelex ceased its international money transfer services in the UK and abroad, which had formerly been branded 'Travelex Wire'.

On 6 August 2020, the business entered administration with PwC being appointed to multiple subsidiaries within the business that day.

PwC later announced that Travelex had completed a debt restructuring. The deal provided £84m of new funding, reduced the business's debt and safeguarded 1,802 UK jobs and a further 3,635 globally. The deal also resulted in the majority of its UK store estate closing with immediate effect and 1,309 UK redundancies. As a result of the deal, Travelex was no longer a Finablr subsidiary, with the company now under the ownership of its debt holders.

The acquiring of Travelex by its creditors went on to split the remaining business into two parts; OldCo and NewCo, together "New Travelex". It confirmed its intention to actively continue a number of components within the group including Africa, Asia, ATMs, Brazil, Middle East, outsourcing and wholesale; but also to place under review (and retain in administration) other formerly-core areas of the remaining business including but not limited to its business in North America, as well as European stores and UK stores.

New Travelex growth 
In November 2021 Travelex Middle East announced plans to expand its store portfolio, with new stores set to open in Bahrain, Sharjah, Dubai and Abu Dhabi. The expansion was announced in light of major regional events, such as Expo 2020 and the 2022 FIFA World Cup, driving a return to travel following the Covid-19 pandemic.

In January 2022 Travelex announced it had launched a full range of services at London Stansted.

In April 2022 Travelex announced the appointment of Richard Wazacz as new CEO.

In June 2022 Travelex announced the creation of more than 1,200 new jobs worldwide, including 1,000 jobs in the UK, 100 across Australia and New Zealand, 60 in Europe and 50 across Asia. The company also stated it had created and filled 150 new jobs in Brazil and 180 new jobs across the Middle East in the six months prior.

Services 
Travelex operates a wide range of foreign currency-based services, including:

 Retail stores: Travelex operates over 1,100 bureaux de change retail stores worldwide offering a wide range of foreign exchange services. In 2021 Travelex launched two new concept stores at Amsterdam Airport Schiphol.
 ATMs: Travelex operates over 900 Travelex branded ATMs worldwide.
 Online and mobile home delivery and click and collect: A facility enabling customers to order cash or pre-paid cards through Travelex’s website or mobile app for home delivery or collection in store.
 Remittance: Remittance services in the Middle East and parts of Asia, plus a digital international money transfer service in Australia, Hong Kong, Japan and Singapore.
 Prepaid cards: Multi-currency prepaid cards operated in partnership with MasterCard.
 Outsourcing/white labelled products: Travelex provides foreign currency services to a range of partners, including supermarkets and retail banks such as Tesco, Sainsbury’s and ASDA.
 Wholesale banknotes: Travelex provides wholesale supply of banknotes to around 200 financial institutions and Central Banks worldwide, representing approximately 25% of global market share.

As of November 2021, the company has 55 international subsidiaries.

Sponsorships 
Travelex sponsored the National Theatre's discounted ticket scheme between 2003 and 2018. In 2010 Lloyd Dorfman gave the theatre £10m, its biggest ever donation. Following redevelopment in 2013, the Cottesloe Theatre was renamed the Dorfman Theatre.

Travelex sponsored the Australia men's national cricket team – initially for its 2001 tour of England and Ireland and later for all its overseas tours between 2002 and 2010. Travelex also sponsored ITV's coverage of the 2002 FIFA World Cup and 2003 Rugby World Cup, as well as the Panasonic Toyota Racing team between 2002 and 2003. In 2005 Travelex announced Jonny Wilkinson as a brand ambassador.

In September 2021 Travelex Australia and New Zealand announced the 'Athlete Alliance', an initiative to support Australian and New Zealand winter athletes with finances, mentoring and education in the runup to the 2022 Winter Olympics and 2022 Winter Paralympics. Athletes involves in the initiative include Sami Kennedy-Sim, Jonty O'Callaghan and Campbell Wright.

References

British brands
Foreign exchange companies
Online remittance providers
Financial services companies of the United Kingdom
Financial services companies established in 1976
Financial services companies based in London
Companies based in the London Borough of Islington
1976 establishments in England
Companies that have entered administration in the United Kingdom